Rafael Souza Silva Novais is a Brazilian footballer. Rafaiel is described as a 'towering defender'.

Career
Rafael has played in his native land Brazil for 4 different clubs, and also in Thailand with Bangkok Glass and Buriram United.

In December 2012, Rafael signed with Malaysia Super League team, Perak for 2013 Malaysia Super League season. He becomes a pillar of the Perak's defense since joining the team.

Rafael joined PDRM FA in December 2013 for the 2014 Malaysia Premier League campaign.

References

External links
www.bangkglassfc.com
Profile at Thaipremierleague.co.th

1984 births
Living people
Brazilian footballers
Brazilian expatriate footballers
Sociedade Esportiva Palmeiras players
Rio Branco Esporte Clube players
Perak F.C. players
Expatriate footballers in Thailand
Expatriate footballers in Malaysia
Association football forwards
Association football defenders
Footballers from Rio de Janeiro (city)